Lilla railway station is located in Pakistan. Lilla is city of Jhelm. in the 8 KM away Moterway M9 pass through. In the lilla Railway Station are almost near to destroy due to different railway problems. Train Services are not available between lilla and khushab.

See also
 List of railway stations in Pakistan
 Pakistan Railways

References

External links

Railway stations in Jhelum District
Railway stations on Malakwal–Khushab branch line